Guraleus ornatus is a species of sea snail, a marine gastropod mollusk in the family Mangeliidae.

Description
The length of the shell attains 8.5 mm, its diameter 3 mm.

Originally described by Sowerby III as a variety of Mangilia alucinans (synonym of Guraleus alucinans), but with a longer spire and with red spots on the ribs. .

Distribution
This marine species is endemic to Australia and can be found off South Australia.

References

External links
  Tucker, J.K. 2004 Catalog of recent and fossil turrids (Mollusca: Gastropoda). Zootaxa 682:1–1295.

ornatus
Gastropods described in 1896
Gastropods of Australia